The 1856 City of Toronto Municipal Election was the City's 22nd municipal election. Polling occurred on the first Monday and Tuesday of the year, January 7th and 8th. Elections for Aldermen and Councilmen were held in seven wards and for the Municipal License Inspector.  

After the election, John Beverley Robinson a member of the family compact and strong supporter of the railroads was elected mayor by City Council, beating John Hutchison a Toronto merchant, who had a reputation for opposing corruption.

Background 

By the standards of 1850s civic politics, where riots disrupted voting in 1855 and 1857, the election of the Council for 1856 was quiet. The issues that animated the campaign included awarding a major public works contract to complete The Esplanade, the controversy around establishing Separate Schools for Roman Catholics, and taverns licenses.

The Esplanade Contract 
In 1853, the City of Toronto passed the Esplanade Act to fill in land along the city's waterfront to provide a route for railways to cross the city and a public promenade along the waterfront. The contract was awarded to Gzowski and Company to construct the Esplanade, but multiple issues created a scandal, and in April 1855, City Council voted to annul the contract. However, the decision to annul the contract led the Grand Trunk Railway, depending on the waterfront route, to threaten to place its track along Queen Street. This led to numerous public meetings and tremendous public pressure to finish the Esplanade.

During the election campaign, City Council was negotiating with the Grand Trunk Railway to construct the Esplanade. A primary concern was who was obligated to pay for crossings over the rail corridor, the city or the railway. A special meeting was called on January 13, 1856, after the election but before the new City Council was sworn in to approve the contract, with the modification that the City was responsible for paying for and building any ramps or bridges over the railway tracks, instead of the Grand Trunk Railway. Despite the previous controversies, the outgoing City Council approved the contract unanimously.

Election of the Mayor 
After the municipal election, City Council convened on January 21, 1856, to elect a Mayor. The proceedings were well-attended, with the gallery filled with spectators eager to witness a contest between John Beverley Robinson, who represented the Family Compact and John Hutchison (Canadian politician), supported by the City's burgeoning mercantile community. 

Alderman Dunn nominated Robinson for the position of Mayor, with the motion seconded by Councilman Davis. Alderman Dunn argued in favour of Robinson, noting that he was the most qualified candidate and the only nominee from St. Patrick's Ward, which had not been represented in the mayoral office for some time. Alderman Crooks nominated John Hutchison for Mayor, challenging Robinson's competency and criticizing him for not taking an interest in Council business when he was Alderman in 1854 and for not running for Council in 1855. Crooks also accused Robinson of arranging Councilman Moodie's absence from Council for the vote. 

In an attempt to influence the mayoral election, Councilman Moodie, an employee of the Grand Trunk Railway and a vocal supporter of Hutchison, was dispatched by his employer to Montreal three days before the election of the Mayor by City Council, despite his objections.  Notwithstanding the controversy, Robinson was elected Mayor by a majority of 4, with the motion carried 15 to 11.

City Council Results
Each ward elected 2 Aldermen and 2 Councilmen. There were ten open seats in the 1856 election, and 15 members of the City Council stood for re-election. Two incumbents lost, Angus Morrison (elected to the Provincial assembly in the summer of 1854) and William Graham.

References 

1856
1856 in Ontario